Wardville is a small unincorporated community in northern Atoka County, Oklahoma, United States, along State Highway 131, 14 miles northeast of Coalgate. The post office was established February 6, 1902 under the name Herbert, Indian Territory. Herbert was located in Atoka County, Choctaw Nation, a territorial-era entity which included portions of today's Atoka, Coal, Hughes and Pittsburg counties. The town was named after Herbert Ward, who was the youngest son of the towns first postmaster, Henry Pleasant Ward.  The name of the town was changed to Wardville on July 18, 1907.  Wardville was named for the before mentioned Henry Pleasant Ward, who served in the territorial House of Representatives and Senate and was an Atoka County judge.  The Wardville Post Office closed in 2007.

Demographics

References

Unincorporated communities in Atoka County, Oklahoma
Unincorporated communities in Oklahoma